Ku Klux Glam is the first collaborative album by American musicians Ariel Pink and R. Stevie Moore, self-released on Bandcamp on February 12, 2012. Some of it was recorded with Jason Falkner, who engineered and performed on several tracks. On April 30, the album was officially issued by Stroll On Records as a limited edition cassette that condensed its original 60-track running order to 20. In June 2016, the album was given its first vinyl pressing.

Track listing

See also
Scared Famous/FF»

References

External links
 
 
 
 

2012 albums
Collaborative albums
Ariel Pink albums
R. Stevie Moore albums